John Mathews may refer to:

John Mathews (American pioneer) (died 1757), settler of the Shenandoah Valley, Virginia
John Mathews (clerk) (1768–1849), American surveyor, politician and lawyer
John Mathews (lawyer) (1744–1802), Governor of South Carolina in 1782 and 1783
John Mathews (cricketer) (1884–1962), English cricketer active from 1903 to 1930 who played for Sussex
John Mathews (theologian) (born 1952), New Testament scholar
John Mathews (professor) (born 1946), Australian professor of competitive dynamics and global strategy
John Albert Mathews (born 1951), American competitive rower
J. E. Mathews, American silent film director working in Australia
John E. Mathews (1892–1955), American lawyer, legislator, and judge
John Joseph Mathews (1894–1979), Osage Nation leader
John Hobson Mathews (1858–1914), Roman Catholic historian, archivist and solicitor
John David Mathews, Pennsylvania State University professor

See also
John Matthews (disambiguation)
John Mathew (disambiguation)